USS Pittsburgh (SSN-720) is a  and is the fourth ship of the United States Navy to be named for Pittsburgh, Pennsylvania.

History
The contract to build Pittsburgh was awarded to the Electric Boat Division of General Dynamics Corporation in Groton, Connecticut on 16 April 1979, and her keel was laid down on 15 April 1983. She was launched on 8 December 1984 and commissioned on 23 November 1985.

On 2 April 1991 Pittsburgh and  conducted submarine-launched Tomahawk missile attacks against Iraq during Operation Desert Storm.

Pittsburgh departed in October 2002 for a deployment to the Mediterranean Sea. There, she again fired Tomahawk missiles into Iraq during Operation Iraqi Freedom. She returned on 27 April 2003.

On 25 February 2019, Pittsburgh returned to her homeport at Naval Submarine Base New London after completion of her final deployment. The submarine then arrived at Bremerton, Washington on 28 May 2019, for a months-long inactivation and decommissioning process.

Pittsburgh was officially deactivated on 17 January 2020 at the Undersea Warfare Museum in Keyport, Washington, and awaited the Submarine Recycling Program at Puget Sound Naval Shipyard in Bremerton, Washington.  She was later decommissioned on 15 April 2020 and the crew released, 37 years to the day of her keel was laid down.

References

Los Angeles-class submarines
Cold War submarines of the United States
Nuclear submarines of the United States Navy
Ships built in Groton, Connecticut
1984 ships
Submarines of the United States